Water skiing competitions at the 2007 Pan American Games in Rio de Janeiro was held from July 21 to July 24 at the Caiçaras Club.

Wakeboarding was added to the sports program, with the men's competition being contested.

Medal summary

Medal table

Medalists

Men's events

Women's events

References

2007 Pan American Games results book

Pan American Games
2007
Events at the 2007 Pan American Games